Mobolla was a town of ancient Caria, in the Rhodian Peraia. The name is not attested in history, but is derived from epigraphic and other evidence.

Its site is occupied by the modern town of Muğla, Asiatic Turkey.

References

Populated places in ancient Caria
Former populated places in Turkey
Ancient Greek archaeological sites in Turkey